St. Joseph City Hall is a historic city hall located at St. Joseph, Missouri.  It was designed by the architectural firm Eckel & Aldrich and built in 1926–1927.  It is a three-story, stone and concrete building in the Italian Renaissance Revival style.  It features a concrete balustraded loggia on the second level, engaged columns, arched openings, and a red tile hipped roof.

It was listed on the National Register of Historic Places in 1985.

References

City and town halls on the National Register of Historic Places in Missouri
City halls in Missouri
Renaissance Revival architecture in Missouri
Government buildings completed in 1927
City Hall
National Register of Historic Places in Buchanan County, Missouri